Saandham Bheekaram is a 1985 Indian Malayalam film, directed by Rajasenan and produced by Mancheri Chandran. The film stars Ratheesh, Shankar, Seema, T. G. Ravi, Captain Raju, Jagathy Sreekumar, Mala Aravindan and Sukumari in the main roles. The film has musical score by Shyam.

Cast

Ratheesh
Shanavas
Shankar
Captain Raju
T. G. Ravi
Mala Aravindan
Bobby Kottarakara
Seema
K. R. Savithri
Ramyasree
Sabitha Anand
Saleema
Sukumari

Soundtrack
The music was composed by Shyam and the lyrics were written by Poovachal Khader.

References

External links
 

1985 films
1980s Malayalam-language films
Films directed by Rajasenan